The first edition of the LOS40 Music Awards were held at the Palacio de Deportes de la Comunidad de Madrid on December 16, 2006. It were hosted by Frank Blanco, Sira Fernández and Tony Aguilar and marked the 40th anniversary of the radio station.

Awards

Performances

Main show
 Dover — "Let Me out"
 Jamelia — "Something About You"
 David Bisbal — "¿Quién Me Iba a Decir?"
 Moby and Amaral — Escapar
 Lucie Silvas — "Nothing Else Matters"
 Paulina Rubio — "Ni Una Sola Palabra"

Concerts
 Antonio Orozco
 Julieta Venegas
 Maná (featuring Juan Luis Guerra)

References

2006 music awards
Los Premios 40 Principales
2006 in Spanish music